Little ROY is a British children's television show, filmed in Cardiff, United Kingdom, which is broadcast by TRTÉ and RTÉ TWO In Ireland, CBBC and CBeebies in the United Kingdom and ABC Kids in Australia. It began and also airs on CBeebies. The show centres on the title character Roy O'Brien, the 5-year-old animated son of a live-action family.  The series is a prequel of Roy, another Irish television show which ran from 1 July 2009 to 7 April 2015. Creator of Roy, Alan Shannon, is the series director.

Plot
The show follows the everyday life of five-year-old Roy O'Brien, a hyperactive and playful little boy. Little Roy is a live action/animation hybrid with Roy as the main character. Each episode will follow a day in the life of the cartoon, as his cartoon abilities always cause some form of mayhem.
To solve his real life dilemma, Roy escapes into his imagination. He takes on the persona of 'Wonder Roy', and with his friend Finn, he plays out his particular predicament of the day and finds a solution.

Cast
Susie Power as Roy O'Brien (voice)
Maclean Burke as Bill O'Brien
Niamh McCann as Maura O'Brien
Robyn Dempsey as Becky O'Brien
Des Keogh as Reg Barker
Billie Traynor as Barbara Barker
Lucia Evans as Joan Jones
Keith Duffy as Jimmy Jones
Reece Adenusi as Tristan Jones
Paul Tylak as Various (voice)
Rebecca Walsh as Various (voice)

Series 1 (2016-17)

Series 2 (2017)

References

External links
 
 Little Roy - CBBC - BBC
 Little Roy - CBeebies - BBC

2016 British television series debuts
2017 British television series endings
2010s Irish television series
2010s British children's television series
British children's animated comedy television series
British preschool education television series
Irish children's television shows
BBC children's television shows
British television series with live action and animation
Television shows set in the Republic of Ireland
Animated television series about children
Television series about families
CBeebies
Animated preschool education television series
2010s preschool education television series
English-language television shows